Women's Midwest College Hockey (WMCH) is an American Collegiate Hockey Association Women's Division 1 club level hockey-only college athletic conference for women's hockey teams. It is one of four ACHA Women's Division 1 conferences, along with the Central Collegiate Women's Hockey Association, Eastern Collegiate Women's Hockey League, and Western Women's Collegiate Hockey League. The league features seven of the top ACHA programs from across the country regardless of geographic considerations, with its membership ranging from Lynchburg, Virginia in the southeast to Minot, North Dakota in the northwest.

WMCH began play during the 2019–20 season with teams that had won four of the last seven national championships (Minnesota in 2013, Liberty in 2015, 2018, and 2019), and each of its members had participated in their respective national tournaments within the past two seasons (Minot State did so in Division 2, the rest in Division 1). The conference lived up to that billing by earning four of the eight available bids to the 2020 ACHA National Tournament, before it was canceled due to the COVID-19 pandemic].

Current membership

Membership timeline

Playoff championship game results

Regular season champions

2019–20 Liberty†

† The WMCH did not formally declare a regular season champion. Liberty was the top-seeded team for the league playoffs due to having the highest ACHA ranking of the members.

ACHA National Tournament appearances

Appearances made while a WMCH member.

See also
American Collegiate Hockey Association
Lindenwood–Belleville Lynx women's ice hockey
Minot State Beavers women's ice hockey
List of ice hockey leagues

External links
Women's Midwest College Hockey Facebook Page
Liberty Women's Hockey
McKendree Women's Hockey
Midland Women's Hockey
Minnesota Women's Club Hockey
Minot State Women's Hockey
Maryville Saints Women's Hockey

References

ACHA Division 1 conferences
3